South Brisbane, also known as Brisbane South, is an electoral district of the Legislative Assembly of Queensland. The electorate encompasses suburbs in Brisbane's inner-south, stretching from East Brisbane to West End, and south to Annerley. Parts of Greenslopes and Coorparoo are also located in the electorate.

South Brisbane is Queensland's oldest electorate, being the only one of the original 16 districts to have been contested at every election. It has generally been considered a safe seat for the Labor Party since 1915, but has in recent election cycles shifted in favour of the Greens. It has only been lost by the Labor party on four occasions: the Country and Progressive National Party's 1929 landslide victory; after the 1957 Labor split, when Premier of Queensland and sitting member Vince Gair quit the party to form the Queensland Labor Party; in 1974, at the height of the Bjelke-Petersen government's popularity; and in 2020 when Jackie Trad lost to the Greens. Anna Bligh, former Premier of Queensland, held the seat from 1995 until her resignation in 2012 after Labor's defeat at the 2012 state election on 24 March. Labor MP Jackie Trad was the member between 2012 and 2020, when Greens candidate Amy MacMahon defeated her at the second attempt.

Members

Election results

References

External links
 

South Brisbane